One Big Spark is an American record label owned and operated by Virb Inc. (formerly Unborn Media Inc., also known as PureVolume.com) as part of the EastWest family of labels

Bands
We Are the Fury
Rediscover
Scenes From A Movie

See also
 List of record labels

External links
 Official site

American record labels
Warner Music labels
Rock record labels